The Benelli CB-M2 was an Italian simple blowback submachine gun resulting from a joint venture between Benelli and Fiocchi Munizioni.

The weapon was chambered for the semi-caseless 9mm AUPO round. The AUPO bullet had an elongated, hollow base that acted as the case. The propellant filled the hollow space, and was sealed into the bullet with a fulminate plug. The AUPO round was "semi-caseless" because the hollow base of the bullet detached from the bullet itself after firing. However, it was not necessary to eject it from the side of the weapon as in a normal cartridge, because the base followed the bullet down the barrel and exited at the muzzle, in a similar fashion to a sabot. This simplified the action of the weapon, allowing it to move back and draw another round from the magazine, since there was no case to eject. With the omission of the ejector mechanism and the ejection step in the action, there were fewer moving parts to jam and cause unreliable functioning of the weapon. The CB M2 never found any customers and the project was shelved.

See also
 Lightweight Small Arms Technologies
 List of caseless firearms

External links
 Benelli CB-M2 at Modern Firearms
 9mm AUPO self-propelled caseless ammunition

References

Benelli Armi SpA
Caseless firearms
Submachine guns
Submachine guns of Italy